Germain Ifedi (born June 2, 1994) is an American football offensive tackle for the Atlanta Falcons of the National Football League (NFL). He played college football at Texas A&M and was drafted by the Seattle Seahawks in the first round of the 2016 NFL Draft.

Early years
A native of Houston, Ifedi attended Westside High School, where he was a three-sport athlete in football, basketball, and track. He earned second-team All-State honors by the Associated Press. He recorded 96 pancakes as a senior, and also blocked a kick. The Westside Wolves went 10–4 on the season, losing the UIL 5A Division II Regional Final to Dekaney, which were led by running back Trey Williams. Regarded a four-star recruit by Scout.com, Ifedi was listed the No. 15 offensive guard prospect in his class. ESPN also listed him as four-star recruit.

College career
After redshirting in his first year at Texas A&M, Ifedi started at Right Guard all 13 season games on the offensive line in 2013. The Aggies offensive line, that also included tackles Jake Matthews and Cedric Ogbuehi, blocked for an offense that ranked in the top 10 nationally in scoring, passing and total offense. Quarterback Johnny Manziel completed 69 percent of his passes over the season, for 4,114 yards and 37 touchdowns, and lead the team in rushing yards with 759. After the season, Ifedi was named Freshman All-American by Sporting News.

In his sophomore season, Ifedi replaced Ogbuehi at right tackle (after Ogbuehi had to replace Matthews at left tackle). Ifedi started all but two games of the season, missing the Auburn and Missouri games due to a sprained knee suffered against Louisiana–Monroe. The Aggies offensive line allowed only 27 sacks (2.1 per game), while quarterbacks Kenny Hill and Kyle Allen attempted a combined 514 passes (39.5 per game), leading the Southeastern Conference in passing yards and touchdowns.

Professional career

Seattle Seahawks
Ifedi was selected 32nd overall by the Seattle Seahawks. He became the fourth consecutive Texas A&M Aggies offensive lineman selected in the first round of an NFL Draft, after Luke Joeckel (2013), Jake Matthews (2014), and Cedric Ogbuehi (2015)

On May 6, 2016, Ifedi signed a four-year deal worth $8.27 million overall with a $4.2 million signing bonus. Ifedi made his first career start and NFL debut on October 2, 2016, against the New York Jets in Week 4 after missing September due to an ankle injury.

Ifedi entered his second season in 2017 as the Seahawks starting right tackle, starting in all 16 games. Ifedi led the league in penalties with 16, after committing only 6 in 13 starts playing at Guard in 2016.

On May 3, 2019, the Seahawks declined the fifth-year option on Ifedi's contract, making him a free agent in 2020.

Chicago Bears
On April 1, 2020, Ifedi signed with the Chicago Bears on a one-year deal. He was placed on the reserve/COVID-19 list by the team on November 3, 2020, and activated three days later. He started in all 16 games for the Bears in 2020, 10 at right guard and six at right tackle.

On April 1, 2021, Ifedi re-signed with the Bears. He suffered a knee injury in Week 5 and was placed on injured reserve on October 13. He was activated on December 20.

Atlanta Falcons
On April 6, 2022, Ifedi signed a one-year contract with the Atlanta Falcons.

Personal life
Ifedi's parents are Nigerian immigrants. Ifedi is a member of the Pi Omicron chapter of Alpha Phi Alpha. His older brother, Martin Ifedi, played defensive end for the Memphis Tigers. His eldest brother, Benedict Ifedi, is a Primary Care-Sports Medicine Physician in Katy, Texas.

At Texas A&M, Ifedi majored in construction science. He interned with Manhattan-Vaughn Construction in 2015, the joint venture which renovated Kyle Field.

References

External links
 Chicago Bears bio
 Texas A&M Aggies bio

1994 births
Living people
American people of Igbo descent
American football offensive tackles
American football offensive guards
Sportspeople from Harris County, Texas
Players of American football from Texas
Texas A&M Aggies football players
Seattle Seahawks players
Chicago Bears players
Atlanta Falcons players